Mühlbachl was a municipality in the district Innsbruck-Land located 15 km south of Innsbruck. Mühlbachl extended from the southern slopes of Schönberg im Stubaital along Matreiwald to Steinach (to the aperture of the Navistal) and the Sill River flew through it. It had 1,349 inhabitants. On 1 January 2022 Mühlbachl and Pfons were merged into the municipality of Matrei am Brenner.

A famous place of pilgrimage, Maria Waldrast, can be reached by hiking up the mountain Serles to the west. The Serles is 2,718 metres high.

Neighboring municipality 
Ellbögen, Fulpmes, Matrei am Brenner, Mieders, Navis, Neustift im Stubaital, Pfons, Schönberg im Stubaital, Steinach am Brenner, Trins, Telfes im Stubai,

Population

References

External links

Cities and towns in Innsbruck-Land District